Owen Roberts (1875–1955) was Associate Justice of the United States Supreme Court.

Owen Roberts may also refer to:

 Owen Roberts (aviator) (1912–1953), British Royal Air Force aviator and founder of Caribbean International Airways
 Owen Roberts (educator) (1835–1915), Welsh educationalist
 Owen W. Roberts (1924–2017), US diplomat and former United States Ambassador to Togo
 Owen F. T. Roberts (1896–1968), British meteorologist
 Owen Morris Roberts (1832–1896), English-born Welsh architect and surveyor

See also 
 Owen Roberts International Airport, Grand Cayman, Cayman Islands